Steven Grahl is the Director of Music and Organist at Christ Church, Oxford. He is also conductor of Schola Cantorum of Oxford. He is a past president of the Incorporated Association of Organists, and previously conducted both the Peterborough Choral Society and the Stamford Chamber Orchestra.

Grahl is known for his work as Chorus-Master for films including Harry Potter and the Prisoner of Azkaban, Lord of the Rings: Return of the King and the Netflix series The Crown.

Biography
Grahl started his musical career as a Chorister at Derby Cathedral. Following organ scholarships at Derby and Norwich Cathedrals, he was awarded an Organ Scholarship to Magdalen College, Oxford, graduating with a degree in music in 2001. He won the Betts prize for further study, and took up a Scholarship at the Royal Academy of Music. He was appointed Assistant Organist at St Marylebone Parish Church in March 2001, and was subsequently made Director of Music in December of the same year at the age of 22. Grahl gained the FRCO diploma and graduated with distinction from the Royal Academy of Music in 2003. He then went on to be an Associate of the Academy in 2010.

Career
His career includes posts as:

2001–2014: Organist & Director of Music at St Marylebone Parish Church, London.
2007–2014: Assistant Organist at New College, Oxford.
2014–2018: Director of Music at Peterborough Cathedral.
2018–: Organist at Christ Church, Oxford.

Discography
As chorus-master:

The Crown (Netflix 2015)
The Phantom of the Opera (Sony 2004)
The Bridge over San Luis Rey (2004)
Finding Neverland (Decca 2004)
Harry Potter and the Prisoner of Azkaban (Warner 2004)
Lord of the Rings: Return of the King (Warner 2003)

As director:

Christmas at Peterborough Cathedral.
2017: Frances-Hoad: Even You Song.

References

External links
Stevengrahl.com
Oxford Music biography
Oxford Leider

Living people
Organists of Christ Church, Oxford
Fellows of Christ Church, Oxford
English choral conductors
British male conductors (music)
21st-century British conductors (music)
21st-century organists
21st-century British male musicians
1975 births